Polymorph is a 1997 cyberpunk novel by American science fiction author Scott Westerfeld.

Plot

"Milica Raznakovic" is the principal alias employed by the protagonist, a shape-changer or "polymorph". Living in a recession-hit future New York, she spends her time partying anonymously, each night in a different body, enjoying casual sex and absolutely no personal attachments. She believes herself to be unique.  However, one night she meets another polymorph: older, malicious and much more powerful than herself. The brief and ultimately hostile encounter leads her to place herself in danger by attempting to determine the newcomer's objective, which somehow involves a wealthy industrialist.  In the process of her investigation, she finds it necessary to seek an ally, reaching out to her last one-night stand, a young man she would normally not have sought out again.

1997 science fiction novels
1997 American novels
Cyberpunk novels
Novels by Scott Westerfeld
Novels set in New York City
Fiction about shapeshifting
1997 debut novels